Toungo may refer to:

Toungo, Burkina Faso, a town in the Tansila Department of Banwa Province 
Toungo, Nigeria, a Local Government Area of Adamawa State